Kendija Aparjode (born 24 December 1996) is a Latvian luger, who competed at the 2018 Winter Olympics, where she finished 22nd in the women's singles.

She started competing in the sport at the age of 13 and was part of the Latvian team that took the silver medal in the team relay at the 2015 European Junior Championships in Oberhof, Germany. She is the daughter of luger Aiva Aparjode and the sister of luger Kristers Aparjods.

References

External links

Latvian female lugers
1996 births
Living people
Lugers at the 2018 Winter Olympics
Lugers at the 2022 Winter Olympics
Olympic lugers of Latvia
People from Sigulda